Richard Michael Moyle (born 1944) is a retired New Zealand academic specialising in ethnomusicology of the Pacific and Australia. He splits his time between several Australasian universities.

Career 
Moyle earned a PhD from the University of Auckland and his 1971 doctoral thesis was titled Samoan traditional music. Moyle spent many years in and around the Pacific recording songs and oral histories from indigenous peoples. He held teaching positions at Indiana University, the University of Hawaii at Manoa and the Australian Institute of Aboriginal and Torres Strait Islander Studies before returning to Auckland to become Director of Pacific Studies.

Among his many unique research projects is the collection of recordings of Samoan Fāgogo (folk tales) at the University of Auckland's Archive of Maori and Pacific Music, with some available in print online in Samoan and English.

References

New Zealand anthropologists
Ethnomusicologists
University of Auckland alumni
Academic staff of the University of Auckland
Indiana University faculty
University of Hawaiʻi faculty
1944 births
Living people
People from Paeroa